Boğazköy is a village in the Şemdinli District in Hakkâri Province in Turkey. The village is populated by Kurds of the Herkî tribe and had a population of 1,049 in 2022. Boğazköy has the six hamlets of Aşağıkayacık, Yukarıkayacık, Sersilte, Tevsiyan, Kelitan and Çem attached to it. Three of these hamlets are unpopulated.

It is a tobacco-producing village.

Population 
Population history of the village from 2000 to 2022:

References 

Villages in Şemdinli District
Kurdish settlements in Hakkâri Province